Red Devil is a census-designated place (CDP) in Bethel Census Area, Alaska, United States. The population was 23 at the 2010 census, down from 48 in 2000. Their post office was founded in 1957.

History
The village was named after the Red Devil Mine, established in 1921 by Hans Halverson when numerous mercury (quicksilver) deposits were discovered in the surrounding Kilbuck-Kuskokwim Mountains. By 1933, the mine was producing substantial quantities of mercury. Although the mine changed ownership twice over the years, it continued to operate until 1971.

Geography

Demographics

Red Devil first appeared on the 1960 U.S. Census as an unincorporated village. In 1980, it was made a census-designated place (CDP).

As of the census  of 2010, there were 23 people, 12 occupied households, residing in the CDP. The population density was 1.9 people per square mile (0.8/km2). There were 22 housing units at an average density of 0.9/sq mi (0.4/km2). The racial makeup of the CDP was 17.4% White, 43.5% Native American, and 39.1% from two or more races. The population was spread out, with 2 people under the age of 14, 2 people 15 to 19 and the remaining 19 people were 25 or older. The median income for a household for 2009 in the CDP was $59,886. 40.4% of the population lives beneath the poverty line.

See also
 Red Devil Airport

References

External links
 History of the Red Devil Mine

Census-designated places in Alaska
Census-designated places in Bethel Census Area, Alaska
Census-designated places in Unorganized Borough, Alaska